The Two Ocean Lake Trail is a  long hiking trail in Grand Teton National Park in the U.S. state of Wyoming. The trail is accessed from the Two Ocean Lake trailhead and loops completely around Two Ocean Lake, providing views of the lake and the Teton Range.

See also
 List of hiking trails in Grand Teton National Park

References

Hiking trails of Grand Teton National Park